Church of the Transfiguration is a historic Episcopal church located at Blue Mountain Lake in Hamilton County, New York.  It is a small, one story, gable roofed structure with a central belfry at the west end.  The building was built in 1885 and is constructed of barked spruce logs, mitred at the corners, and set upon a high foundation of random fieldstone.  The church features Tiffany glass windows and a Meneely bell donated by Mrs. Levi P. Morton wife of future Vice-President under Benjamin Harrison.

It was designed by Manley N. Cutter and built by Thomas Wallace. The church was added to the National Register of Historic Places in 1977.

References

Churches on the National Register of Historic Places in New York (state)
Churches in Hamilton County, New York
Episcopal church buildings in New York (state)
National Register of Historic Places in Hamilton County, New York
1885 establishments in New York (state)
Churches completed in 1885